Nathan S. Greene (January 21, 1810October 4, 1900) was an American businessman and Republican politician.  He served one term in the Wisconsin State Assembly, representing Jefferson County.

Biography

Born in Saratoga County, New York, Greene moved to Milwaukee, Wisconsin Territory, and then to Milford, Wisconsin, where he owned a general store and operated a lumber and milling business. In 1863, Greene served in the Wisconsin State Assembly and was a Republican. During the American Civil War, Greene served as a draft commissioner. In 1884, Greene moved to Fort Atkinson, Wisconsin, where he owned a dairy. Greene died in Fort Atkinson, Wisconsin.

References

1810 births
1900 deaths
People from Saratoga County, New York
People from Milford, Wisconsin
People of Wisconsin in the American Civil War
Businesspeople from Wisconsin
Farmers from Wisconsin
Republican Party members of the Wisconsin State Assembly
19th-century American politicians
People from Fort Atkinson, Wisconsin